Qadamgah is a city in Razavi Khorasan Province, Iran.

Qadamgah may also refer to:
 Qadamgah, East Azerbaijan
 Qadamgah, Arsanjan, Fars Province
 Qadamgah, Bavanat, Fars Province
 Qadamgah, Mamasani, Fars Province
 Qadamgah, Marvdasht, Fars Province
 Qadamgah, Hormozgan
 Qadamgah, Markazi
 Qadamgah, South Khorasan
 Qadamgah (ancient site), an Achaemenid rock-cut structure
 Qadamgah Hazrat Ali, A historical place in Khalilabad County, Iran

See also
 Qadamgah-e Bi Bi Shahr Banu
 Qadamgah-e Emam Reza (disambiguation)
 Qadamgah-e Hazrat-e Ali